Bhushan Patel (born in Mumbai, India) is a Bollywood film director, actor and cinematographer, best known for directing the horror movies 1920: Evil Returns, Ragini MMS 2 and Alone.

Personal life
Bhushan Patel is a Gujarati. His father was a cameraman. Patel studied at Jamnabai Narsee School and lived at Vile Parle next to Vikram Bhatt, another director he became friends with.

Filmography

As director 

 Lipstick (TV Series) (co-director) 
 Aathvaan Vachan (TV Series) 
 Dwarkadheesh: Bhagwaan Shree Krishn (TV Series) (episode director) 
 1920: Evil Returns 
 Ragini MMS 2 
 Alone 
 Time Machine (TV Mini-Series) 
 Amavas

As Cinematographer 

 Gunehgar 
 Dastak (as Bhooshan Patel) 
 Bambai Ka Babu (as Bhooshan Patel) 
 Tamanna (as Bhooshan Patel) 
 Kartoos 
 Yeh Hai Mumbai Meri Jaan (as Bhooshan Patel)

As actor 

 Phir Teri Kahani Yaad Aayee 
 Junoon

References

External links 

Hindi-language film directors
Living people
Gujarati people
Film directors from Gujarat
Year of birth missing (living people)